Coleophora sublineariella is a moth of the family Coleophoridae that can be found in Afghanistan and Turkmenistan.

The larvae feed on Cerasus and Crataegus species. They feed on the leaves of their host plant.

References

External links

sublineariella
Moths of Asia
Moths described in 1967